Deiva Vaakku is a 1992 Indian Tamil-language drama film directed by M. S. Madhu, starring Karthik and Revathi. The film, produced by T. Siva, was released on 11 September 1992. It is a remake of the Telugu film Sankeertana (1987).

Plot 

Amsaveni, after channeling the voice of the Goddess in childhood, is treated as such by her grateful village after water is found after a drought. Her Duplicate elder brother Vallathar exploits his young sister's powers to make himself rich. When Amsaveni falls in love with misunderstood drunk-with-heart-of-gold Thambidurai, Vallathar is unhappy with her decision, due to the difference in status between the two and, more importantly, he can see his money supply running out. So Vallathar tries to put Thambidurai off in various ways from marrying his sister.

Cast 

Karthik as Thambidurai
Revathi as Amsaveni / Aatha
Vijayakumar as Vallathar
Srividya as Vallathar's wife
Radha Ravi as Veeraiyan
Vadivelu as Karuvadu
Yuvasri as Thambidurai's mother
Senthil
Pandu
Singamuthu
A. K. Veerasami as Priest
Brinda
Baby Sadhana
Baby Sajana
Krishnamoorthy

Soundtrack 
The soundtrack was composed by Ilaiyaraaja, with lyrics written by Vaali and Gangai Amaran. The song "Valli Valli Ena" is set in Shivaranjani raga.

Reception 
The Indian Express wrote, "Here the storyline is thin, the script is not that engaging, but the effective camera work [..] A superb performance by petite Revathi [..] saves the film from being run-of-the-mill". New Straits Times wrote, "This movie should be of special interest to those who frequently seek advice from temple mediums".

References

External links 
 
 

1990s Tamil-language films
1992 films
Films scored by Ilaiyaraaja
Tamil remakes of Telugu films